Chernobyl: The Lost Tapes is a 2022 British documentary film, directed and produced by James Jones. It tells the story of the Chernobyl disaster using personal interviews with people who were there and newly discovered, dramatic footage filmed at the nuclear plant, most of it never seen before in the West. It was released for streaming on Sky UK on February 28, 2022 and on HBO platforms on June 22, 2022.

References

External links
 
 

2022 films
2022 documentary films
British documentary films
2020s English-language films
Works about the Chernobyl disaster
2020s British films